Tržišče is a settlement along the road linking Mokronog and Sevnica in the Lower Carniola region in east-central Slovenia. It is part of the Municipality of Sevnica, which is included in the Lower Sava Statistical Region. St. George's Hill lies to the northwest of the village. The rail line from Sevnica to Trebnje runs through the settlement and has a station there. The settlement includes the hamlets of Mostec and Sveta Trojica.

Churches
The parish church in the settlement is dedicated to the Holy Trinity and belongs to the Roman Catholic Diocese of Novo Mesto. It dates to the first quarter of the 16th century. A second church in the southern part of the settlement is dedicated to the Assumption of Mary and was originally a 13th-century building that was rebuilt around 1700.

References

External links
Tržišče at Geopedia
 

Populated places in the Municipality of Sevnica